During the 1957–58 Juventus F.C. season, the club competed in both the Serie A and Coppa Italia.

Summary 
After three seasons of disaster performance Juventus had a great season for the team clinching its 10th championship   thanks to the "trio magico" with a superb Welsh forward John Charles in attacking along Omar Sivori from River Plate and Boniperti.

Squad 

 (Captain)

Competitions

Serie A

League table

Matches

Statistics

Squad statistics

Goalscorers
 

31 goals
  Omar Sívori

29 goals
 John Charles

9 goals
 Giampiero Boniperti

7 goals
 Gino Stacchini

5 goals
 Antonio Montico

3 goals
 Bruno Nicolè
 Giorgio Stivanello

2 goals
 Umberto Colombo
 Giuseppe Corradi
 Flavio Emoli

1 goal
 Rino Ferrario
 Piergiorgio Sartore
 Romano Voltolina

References

External links 
 rsssf.com

Juventus F.C. seasons
Juventus
Italian football championship-winning seasons